The Female Infanticide Prevention Act, 1870, also Act VIII of 1870 was a legislative act passed in British India, to prevent murder of female infants. The Section 7 of this Act declared that it was initially applicable only to the territories of Oudh, North-Western Provinces and Punjab, but the Act authorized the Governor General to extend the law to any other district or province of the British Raj at his discretion.

Text

The British colonial authorities passed the Female Infanticide Prevention Act 1870, under pressure of Christian missionaries and social reformers seeking an end to the incidences of female infanticides in the Indian subcontinent. The law's preamble stated that the murder of female infants is believed to be commonly committed in certain parts of British India, and these were Oudh, North-Western Provinces and Punjab. The Act initially applied to these regions.

The law authorized the creation of a police force to maintain birth, marriage and death registers, to conduct census of the district at its discretion, enforce a special tax on the district to pay for the expenses and entertainment of said police officers. The Act also stipulated a prison sentence of six months or a fine of thirty thousand rupees, or both, on anyone who disobeyed or obstructed the police officers enforcing the Act. Section 6 of the Act allowed the police officer to seize a child from any person he suspects may neglect or endanger any female child, as well as force collect a monthly fee from that person.

Current status
The Act was in force until 1981 in Pakistan, when it was superseded by an ordinance.

Notes

Legislation in British India
Sex selection in India
1870 in India
1870 in law
1870 in British law
Childhood in India